Ray Mickens (born January 4, 1973) is a former professional American football cornerback. Mickens entered the National Football League (NFL) after receiving All-American honors at Texas A&M University. He last played professionally for the New England Patriots.  His brother Fred Williams played for the Houston Oilers.  Post-NFL Ray Mickens owns  (along with Leonard Mickens) M2 Concepts  a privately held, minority owned food, beverage, and retailing company  headquartered in Dallas/Ft. Worth area.

High school and college
Mickens grew up in El Paso, Texas, where he attended Andress High School and was a Division 1-5A All-State running back in the 1990, 1991 football seasons.  While in high school, he played against the Midland Lee Rebels football team to capture the Regional Championship.

Mickens played football and was a sprinter on the track and field team at Texas A&M University.  He was one of the top coverage cornerbacks in the country and was an All-American and All-Southwest Conference player in both his junior and senior years.  He had four interceptions and broke up three other passes during his senior year.  In spite of his relatively diminutive size, Mickens also handled run support well with 59 total tackles.  He was also among the top punt returners in the nation that year with an 11.7 yard average.  In the last game of his career, an Alamo Bowl victory against Michigan, he shut down the Wolverine receivers, switching positions when necessary to stop the "hot" receiver.  For his career, he had 162 tackles and nine interceptions for Texas A&M.  He started the final 34 games of his college career and finished his career 4th on A&M's all-time passes defended list.

NFL

Mickens was drafted in the third-round by the New York Jets in the 1996 NFL Draft. He played for the Jets from 1996 to 2004.  Mickens only sat out two games in his first eight NFL seasons before missing the 2004 season because of a torn ACL.  He built a reputation as one of the top nickel backs in the NFL and also a very capable starter. He played in 126 games with 36 starts over the course of his first eight seasons while registering 365 tackles, 79 passes defended, 11 INT, four forced fumbles and six sacks.  Mickens was released by the Jets..  He signed a one-year contract with the Browns as a free agent prior to the 2005 season and played in all 16 games, starting three, and recording 33 tackles and 16 passes defended.

Mickens signed with the Jets once again on May 31, 2006, but was eventually waived when rosters were reduced to the 53 men following the last pre-season game.  He was signed by the New England Patriots in December 2006 and was a prominent player in their run to the division championship game.  He filed for free agency on March 3, 2007.

Personal
His brother Fred Williams played for the 1993 Houston Oilers.

Mickens won the 1999 Madden Bowl.

References

External links
http://www.raymickens.com
http://www.nfl.com/players/playerpage/3953
http://www.patriots.com/team/index.cfm?ac=playerbio&bio=32392

1973 births
Living people
American football cornerbacks
African-American players of American football
New England Patriots players
Cleveland Browns players
New York Jets players
Texas A&M Aggies football players
21st-century African-American sportspeople
20th-century African-American sportspeople
Players of American football from El Paso, Texas